Flavia Bujor (born 8 August 1988) is a French novelist of Romanian origin. She lived in Romania until the age of two when she moved to Paris, France. She had a passion for stories from an early age. She lives with her parents in Paris.

At the young age of fourteen, Flavia Bujor was being hailed as France's Literary Sensation. From an early age, her parents encouraged her for her love for books teaching her to read before she started school and indulging her passion for stories by telling her tales. Her first book was the children's story The Prophecy of the Stones or "The Prophecy of The Gems" (original title: "La Prophétie des Pierres"). She began writing this novel at the age of 12, and its success has prompted the book's translation into twenty-three different languages.

Bibliography 
 
 blurb

References

1988 births
Living people
Romanian emigrants to France
French children's writers
French women children's writers
Lycée Louis-le-Grand alumni